Ralph Vaughan Williams's Symphony in E minor, published as Symphony No. 6, was composed in 1944–47, during and immediately after World War II and revised in 1950. Dedicated to Michael Mullinar, it was first performed, in its original version, by Sir Adrian Boult and the BBC Symphony Orchestra on 21 April 1948. Within a year it had received some 100 performances, including the U.S. premiere by the Boston Symphony Orchestra under Serge Koussevitzky on 7 August 1948. Leopold Stokowski gave the first New York performances the following January with the New York Philharmonic and immediately recorded it, declaring that "this is music that will take its place with the greatest creations of the masters." However, Vaughan Williams, very nervous about this symphony, threatened several times to tear up the draft. At the same time, his programme note for the first performance took a defiantly flippant tone.

Perhaps the composer never intended the symphony to be programmatic, but it was inevitable that his post-war audience should associate its disturbing and often violent character with the detonation of the atomic bombs over Hiroshima and Nagasaki. In response to these questions, he is widely quoted as having said, "It never seems to occur to people that a man might just want to write a piece of music". In connection with the last movement, the composer did eventually suggest that a quotation from Act IV of Shakespeare's The Tempest comes close to the music's meaning: "We are such stuff / As dreams are made on; and our little life / Is rounded with a sleep."

The Symphony is noteworthy for its unusually discordant harmonic language, reminiscent in approach if not in technique of his Symphony No. 4 from over a decade earlier, and for its inclusion of a tenor saxophone among the woodwinds. In several respects this symphony marks the beginning of Vaughan Williams's experiments with orchestration that so characterise his late music.

The symphony is in four linked movements (i.e. one movement leads straight into the next, with no pause between them), and includes a number of ideas that return in various guises throughout the symphony, for example the use of simultaneous chords a half-step apart, or the short-short-long rhythmic figure.

Movements

Allegro 

The symphony begins very loudly with the full orchestra playing simultaneously in F minor and E minor. The chaotic rush of notes makes the listener's job of getting or keeping bearings relatively difficult. Because the composer uses so many disruptive techniques in both rhythm and harmony, there is often no clear sense of metre or key. Structurally, the movement falls loosely into the category of sonata form with its carefully organised contrasting themes and key centres, though this may not be apparent on first hearing. Indeed, the most striking point of contrast may be the reappearance near the end of the movement of one of the main themes in a clear and rich E major. The first movement ends with a sustained unison E in the low instruments, at which point the second movement begins.

Moderato 

The second movement starts a tritone away, in B-flat minor. The main themes are so chromatic that they eventually have little sense of profile. A central feature of this movement is a "rat-a-tat" rhythmic motive that recurs through most of the movement, beginning in the second measure. At one point that figure goes away for a while, and the effect of its eventual return is an almost palpable sense of dread. After an enormous battering climax fuelled by that figure (including the single loudest point in the entire symphony), the movement winds down with a lengthy solo played by the cor anglais, still accompanied by the same three-note ostinato. The sustained last note links via a half-step drop to the next movement.

Scherzo: Allegro vivace 

This movement, heavily fugal in texture, follows a typical scherzo/trio structure, but the overall feel is hardly one of amusement; the high spirits are decidedly raucous and sardonic. Although the rhythmic style is less disjointed than in the first movement (the listener has little trouble following the meter here), the harmony (heavily dominated by tritones, or lowered fifths) and orchestration both revert to the first movement's density. The trio section features the tenor saxophone's only true solo role in the symphony; when the scherzo material recurs the composer inverts the fugue subject and eventually combines that form with the original version. With the final climax (the trio theme stated by full orchestra) the music almost collapses, leaving the bass clarinet holding the sustained note that links to the Finale.

Epilogue: Moderato 

This movement follows a vaguely fugal structure, but that structure is not especially perceptible to the listener because the entire movement is marked pp, meaning played very softly (and at one point senza crescendo, an instruction not to increase the volume), with the further admonishment senza espressivo, meaning without any expression. This makes the movement extremely difficult to play, and the audience must use great concentration to keep from losing track of the composer's train of thought. Vaughan Williams himself, in his aforementioned programme note, speaks of “drifting” and “whiffs of theme” in characterising the music. This is the movement that sparked so many to see the work as a whole as being a vision of a post-nuclear world. Writers have used such words as “dead”, “barren”, and “ruins” to describe it. Curiously enough, both the second and fourth movements have the same tempo marking but the feel is decidedly slower here.

The symphony continues to provoke much speculation about its "meaning", and the only clue from Vaughan Williams himself (as quoted by his widow), points us in the direction of an agnostic Nunc dimittis.

A typical performance takes about 35 minutes. It is scored for a large orchestra including: 2 flutes, piccolo (doubling 3rd flute), 2 oboes, cor anglais, 2 clarinets in B, tenor saxophone (doubling bass clarinet in B), 2 bassoons, contrabassoon, 4 horns in F, 3 trumpets in B, 3 trombones, tuba, timpani, side drum, triangle, bass drum, cymbals, xylophone, harp (optionally doubled), and strings.

Performance history
The first performance was given by the BBC Symphony Orchestra conducted by Sir Adrian Boult at the Royal Albert Hall in London on 21 April 1948.
Serge Koussevitzky led the score's American premiere on 7 August 1948, at Tanglewood, with the Boston Symphony Orchestra. Before that year was out, the same musicians had taken the work to Boston, Pittsburgh and Chicago (3 December).

Recordings
The first two recordings were initially released on 78rpm discs. The first one was made on 21 February 1949 by the Philharmonic-Symphony Orchestra of New York under Leopold Stokowski, who had been a fellow organ student of Vaughan Williams at the Royal College of Music in the 1890s (and was to give the U.S. premiere of his Ninth Symphony in 1958). The second was by Sir Adrian Boult days later with the London Symphony Orchestra. Both used the original version of the third movement. The composer revised that movement in 1950; Boult immediately recorded it for HMV and that new version was included in the subsequent LP releases. Boult also made a new recording of the symphony in late 1953 for Decca in the presence of the composer, who thanked the musicians at the end of those sessions; this speech was taped and included on disc releases as an appendix to the symphony. Altogether there have been 26 recordings:
Stokowski — Philharmonic-Symphony Orchestra of New York — Columbia Masterworks ML 4214 (Manhattan Center, Feb. 21, 1949)
Boult — London Symphony Orchestra — HMV 10-inch BLP 1001 (Abbey Road, Feb. 23–24, 1949)
Boult — London Philharmonic Orchestra — Decca LXT 2911 (Kingsway Hall, Dec. 28–31, 1953)
Barbirolli — Boston Symphony Orchestra — Music & Arts CD 251–2 (Symphony Hall, Oct. 30, 1964)
Abravanel — Utah Symphony Orchestra — Vanguard VSD-71160 (University of Utah Music Hall, Dec. 1965)
Boult — New Philharmonia Orchestra — HMV ASD 2329 (Abbey Road, Feb. 27 and March 1, 1967)
Previn — London Symphony Orchestra — RCA Victor SB 6769 (Kingsway Hall, April 1–3, 1968)
Barbirolli — Bavarian Radio Symphony Orchestra — Orfeo C 265 921 B (Herkulessaal, April 10, 1970)
Boult — New Philharmonia Orchestra — BBC Legends BBCL 4256-2 (Cheltenham Town Hall, July 7, 1972)
Boult — BBC Symphony Orchestra — Carlton BBC Radio Classics 15656 91642 (Royal Albert Hall, Aug. 16, 1972)
Berglund — Bournemouth Symphony Orchestra — HMV ASD 3127 (Kingsway Hall, June 17–18, 1974)
Handley — London Philharmonic Orchestra — Classics for Pleasure CFP 40334 (Walthamstow Assembly Hall, Feb. 5–6, 1979)
Davis-C — Bavarian Radio Symphony Orchestra — BR Klassik 900705 (Gasteig, April 30, 1987)
Rozhdestvensky — USSR State Symphony Orchestra — Melodiya CD 10-02170-5 (Philharmonia Building, Leningrad, Oct. 31, 1988)
Thomson — London Symphony Orchestra — Chandos CHAN 8740 (St Jude-on-the-Hill, Hampstead, Dec. 16–17, 1988)
Slatkin — Philharmonia Orchestra — RCA Victor Red Seal RD 60556 (Watford Town Hall, April 6–8, 1990)
Marriner — Academy of St Martin in the Fields — Collins Classics 12022 (Henry Wood Hall, May 1990)
Davis-A — BBC Symphony Orchestra — Teldec 9031-73127-2 (St Augustine's Church, London, Oct. 1990)
Bakels — Bournemouth Symphony Orchestra — Naxos 8.550733 (Winter Gardens, Bournemouth, Nov. 12, 1993)
Handley — Royal Liverpool Philharmonic — EMI Eminence CD EMX 2230 (Philharmonic Hall, Liverpool, March 5–6, 1994)
Haitink — London Philharmonic — EMI CD 5 56762 2 (Colosseum, Watford, Dec. 13–14, 1997)
Norrington — London Philharmonic — Decca 458 658–2 (Colosseum, Watford, Dec. 15–16, 1997)
Hickox — London Symphony Orchestra — Chandos CHSA 5016 (All Saints Church, Tooting, Jan. 21–22, 2003)
Elder — Hallé Orchestra — Hallé CD HLL 7547 (Bridgewater Hall, Manchester, Nov. 10, 2016)
Manze — Royal Liverpool Philharmonic — Onyx 4184 (Philharmonic Hall, Liverpool, April 21–23, 2017)
Pappano — London Symphony Orchestra — LSO Live LSO0867D (Barbican Hall, March 15, 2020)
Wilson - BBC Philharmonic - BBC Music Magazine, Vol. 30, No. 8

Other uses
Part of the symphony's first movement (Allegro) was used as the theme tune for the ITV drama A Family at War.

References

Symphony 006
1947 compositions
Compositions in E minor